Shelagh Fogarty (born 13 January 1966) is a radio and television presenter and journalist. She currently presents the afternoon programme on LBC, having previously co-hosted the BBC Radio 5 Live breakfast show with Nicky Campbell.

Early life

Fogarty was born in Anfield, Liverpool. Her Irish parents moved to England in the late 1950s. One of six children, She went to the Mary Help of Christians R.C. High School, a girls' Catholic grammar school run by the Salesian Sisters of Don Bosco, on Stonebridge Lane in Croxteth. She studied French and Spanish at Durham University, spending a year in Barcelona and graduating in 1988.

Career
Learning her trade, she worked as a BBC trainee at Radio Humberside, Radio Guernsey, Radio Bristol, Radio Sheffield and Radio Merseyside. She co-hosted the Radio Merseyside breakfast show in the early 1990s with Roger Summerskill for around three years, entitled Morning Merseyside. In 1998, she moved to Merseyside Tonight on Radio Merseyside.

Fogarty joined Radio 4 in 1994, and went freelance in 1999.

Five Live
She then moved on to Radio 5 Live where she co-presented Weekend Breakfast before moving to co-host the Breakfast programme with Nicky Campbell. In April 2011, Fogarty took over from Gabby Logan on the lunchtime show. The show covered news, sport and interviews. Each day there was a special feature. On Mondays the feature was the sports team. Health was covered on Tuesdays. The programme was broadcast from Westminster on Wednesdays when Fogarty was joined by political correspondent John Pienaar, a guest journalist and three members of Parliament to cover Prime Minister's Questions. Thursday's consumer desk included Martin Lewis. Five Life on Fridays looked at work and lifestyle.

In January 2008, she had a gun pointed at her and her film crew while filming a report for ITV's Tonight with Trevor McDonald, in Croxteth where she was brought up. She had been asked to return to the area to see how safe she felt walking around after dark.

In January 2010, Fogarty joined the presenting team of The Daily Politics, co-hosting the show on Thursdays with Andrew Neil.

In March 2010, she swam a mile in The Serpentine in Hyde Park for Sport Relief 2010.

In July 2014, Fogarty announced that she would be leaving 5 Live to explore other opportunities. Her final programme was broadcast on 3 September.

LBC
Following a period as a guest presenter with LBC, in December 2014 it was announced that Fogarty would join the station to present its 1:00 pm-4:00 pm weekday slot.

Awards
Fogarty won the Sony Silver Award in 2007 for the 5 Live Breakfast programme as Best News and Current Affairs Programme with Nicky Campbell.

Controversy
Fogarty crossed picket lines during the 2005 BBC strike. At 7:00 am on the day of the strike, Fogarty went on air live, without co-presenter Nicky Campbell and without giving herself a name-check. Sports reporter Alistair Bruce-Ball responded: "Thanks, Shelagh", as she handed over to him.

During a December 2009 breakfast show, she chastised rock band Rage Against the Machine for their use of profanity.

References

External links
 Shelagh Fogarty, Yellow Poppy Media
 Shelagh Fogarty on LBC

1966 births
Alumni of Durham University
BBC Radio 5 Live presenters
BBC newsreaders and journalists
English journalists
English people of Irish descent
English radio personalities
English television presenters
Living people
Radio presenters from Liverpool
Television presenters from Liverpool
LBC radio presenters